The 2018–19 is Academica Clinceni's 12th season of competitive football by Academica Clinceni, and the 6th consecutive in Liga II. Academica Clinceni will compete in the Liga II and in Cupa României.

Season overview

Background

Previous season positions

First-team squad 

Last updated on 10 March 2019

Summer transfers

In:

Out:

Pre-season and friendlies

Competitions

Overview

Liga II

The Liga II fixture list was announced on 19 July 2018.

League table

Results summary

Position by round

Matches

Cupa României

Statistics

Appearances and goals

|-
|}

Squad statistics
{|class="wikitable" style="text-align: center;"
|-
! 
! style="width:70px;"|Liga II
! style="width:70px;"|Cupa României
! style="width:70px;"|Home
! style="width:70px;"|Away
! style="width:70px;"|Total Stats
|-
|align=left|Games played       || 0 || 0 || 0 || 0 || 0 
|-
|align=left|Games won          || 0 || 0 || 0 || 0 || 0 
|-
|align=left|Games drawn        || 0 || 0 || 0 || 0 || 0 
|-
|align=left|Games lost         || 0 || 0 || 0 || 0 || 0 
|-
|align=left|Goals scored       || 0 || 0 || 0 || 0 || 0 
|-
|align=left|Goals conceded     || 0 || 0 || 0 || 0 || 0 
|-
|align=left|Goal difference    || 0 || 0 || 0 || 0 || 0 
|-
|align=left|Clean sheets       || 0 || 0 || 0 || 0 || 0 
|-
|align=left|Goal by Substitute || 0 || 0 || 0 || 0 || 0 
|-
|align=left|Players used       || – || – || – || – || – 
|-
|align=left|Yellow cards       || 0 || 0 || 0 || 0 || 0 
|-
|align=left|Red cards          || 0 || 0 || 0 || 0 || 0 
|-
|align=left| Winning rate      || 0% || 0% || 0% || 0% || 0% 
|-

Goalscorers

Goal minutes

Last updated: 2018 (UTC) 
Source: Soccerway

Hat-tricks

Clean sheets

Disciplinary record

Attendances

See also

 2018–19 Liga II
 2018–19 Cupa României

References

FC Academica Clinceni seasons
Academica, Clinceni , FC